The 1986 Davidson Wildcats football team represented Davidson College as a member of the Southern Conference during the 1986 NCAA Division I-AA football season. Led by second-year head coach Vic Gatto, the Wildcats compiled an overall record of 0–9 with a mark of 0–6 in conference play, placing last out of nine teams in the SoCon. Although not SoCon members, their games against Bucknell and Lafayette were designated Southern Conference games.

Schedule

References

Davidson
Davidson Wildcats football seasons
College football winless seasons
Davidson Wildcats football